Brazzeia is a genus of plants in the family Lecythidaceae. It contains the following accepted species, according to 'The Plant List' :
 Brazzeia congoensis  Baill. 
 Brazzeia longipedicellata  Verdc. 
 Brazzeia soyauxii  (Oliv.) Tiegh.

References

Lecythidaceae
Ericales genera
Taxonomy articles created by Polbot
Taxa named by Henri Ernest Baillon